Kaduvakkulam Antony (9 November 1936 – 4 February 2001) was an Indian actor from Kerala who performed in more than 300 films as a comedian during the 1960s and 1970s. One journalist considers him to have been one of the best and most popular comedians in Malayalam cinema.

Filmography

 1996 Aramana Veedum Anjoorekkarum.
 1995 Mannar Mathai Speaking as drama booking agent
 1995 Highway
 1995 Arabia (film) as PC Velapp
 1995 Thumboli Kadappuram
 1991 Mimics Parade
 1990 Kadathanadan Ambadi
 1987 Nee Allenkil Njan as Philip
 1987 Kaalathinte Sabhdam as Kunjan Nair
 1987 Kottum Kuravayum
 1987 Narathan Keralathil
 1986 Kulambadikal
 1986 Arorui Arangorungi
 1985 Azhi
 1985 Chorakku Chora as Paramu
 1985 Kiratham as Narayana Pilla
 1985 Njaan Piranna Naattil as Police constable
 1984 Kadamattathachan as Thomachan
 1984  Krishna Guruvaayoorappa 
 1983 Ahankaram
 1983 Ee Yugam as Pappan
 1983 Ankam as Krishna Pilla
 1982 Kakka
 1982 Vidhichathum Kothichathum
 1982 Keni
 1982 Aarambham as Anthappan
 1982 Kaalam as Kurup
 1982 Panchajanyam as Kuttan Pilla
 1981 Agnisaram
 1980 Vedikettu
 1979 Avalude Prathikaram
 1979 Lillypookkal
 1979 Pichathikuttappan
 1979 Driver Madyapichirunnu
 1979 Maamaankam as Velappan
 1978 Thacholi Ambu
 1978 Thamburatti as Padmanabha Kurup
 1978 Beena as Kunjappi
 1978 Kanalkattakal as Keshavankutty
 1978 Mukkuvine Snehicha Bhootham
 1977 Sathyavan Savithri
 1977 Pattalam Janaki
 1976 Amma
 1975 Love Letter
 1975 Chief Guest
 1975 Criminals (Kayangal)
 1974 Arakkallan Mukkakallan
 1974 Durga
 1974 Panchathanthram as Charlie
 1974 Ankathattu
 1974 Sapthaswarangal as Geevargese Chandi
 1974 Rahasya Rathri
 1973 Ajnathavasam as Director London
 1973 Thenaruvi
 1973 Pacha Nottukal as Puluvan Thoma
 1973 Masappadi Mathupilla
 1972 Pulliman
 1972 Preethi
 1971 Kalithozhi
 1971 Vimochanasamaram
 1971 Bobanum Moliyum
 1970 Moodalmanju as Sankaran Nair
 1970 Nazhikakkallu
 1970 Pearl View as House keeper
 1970 Ambalapravu
 1970 Dathuputhran as Paulose
 1970 Vivaham Swargathil
 1969 Virunnukari as Paramu
 1969 Veettu Mrugam
 1969 Kannoor Deluxe
 1969 Susy
 1969 Jawala
 1968 Viruthan Shanku as Krishnan
 1968 Thirichadi
 1968 Punnapra Vayalar as Velayudhan
 1968 Ezhu Rathrikal
 1968 Inspecter
 1968 Thulabharam
 1967 Arakillam
 1967 Khadeeja
 1967 Aval
 1967 Iruttinte Athmavu as Jyothsyan
 1967 MAinatheruvi Kolacase
 1967 Kavalam Chundan
 1967 Udhyogastha
 1967 Chitramela
 1967 Olathumathi
 1967 Agniputhri as Paachu Pilla
 1966 Kalyanarathriyil
 1966 Station Master
 1966 Kanakachilanka
 1966 Kayamkulam Kochunni as Bava
 1966 Pakalkinavu
 1965 Bhoomiyile Malakha as Jimmy
 1965 Ammu
 1964 Sree Guruvayoorappan as Olapram Pachan
 1962 Sreerama Pattabhishekam
 1962 Snehadeepam as Factory worker
 1961 Bhakta Kuchela

References

External links
 
 Kaduvakkulam Antony at MSI

Indian male stage actors
Male actors in Malayalam cinema
Indian male film actors
Male actors from Kerala
2001 deaths
1936 births
20th-century Indian male actors
People from Alappuzha district